Chupong Changprung (Thai; ชูพงษ์ ช่างปรุง, RTGS: Dan Chupong; born March 23, 1981 in Kalasin Province, Thailand; Thai nickname: "Deaw", เดี่ยว) is a Thai  actor, martial artist and stuntman. He is also known by his Westernized name, Dan Chupong (the given name is alternatively spelled Choopong or Choupong and the first name is sometimes Danny). Starting out as part of the stunt team of martial-arts choreographer Panna Rittikrai, Chupong's first film credit was as "Bodyguard 4" in Ong-Bak: Muay Thai Warrior. He then went on to leading roles in the 2004 film, Born to Fight and 2006 film Dynamite Warrior. He has also appeared in  Nonzee Nimibutr's Queen of Langkasuka (2008), Somtum (2008), Ong Bak 2 (uncredited) and portrayed the main antagonist in Ong Bak 3. He graduate bachelor's degree from Srinakarinwirot Institute of Physical Education

To stay prepared for his film roles, Chupong has a regular workout routine that includes running and gymnastics. He took acting lessons to prepare for his role in Dynamite Warrior.

Filmography

Television

References

External links
 

1981 births
Dan Chupong
Living people
Dan Chupong
Dan Chupong
Dan Chupong